In Old New Mexico is a 1945 American western drama film. Released on May 15, 1945, it was the second of three Cisco Kid films made that year with Duncan Renaldo as Cisco and Martin Garralaga as Pancho.

In this release, Cisco's real name is Juan Carlos Francisco Antonio. This version depicting Cisco as a road bandit is closer to the original Cisco character created by O. Henry in his 1907 short story "The Caballero's Way".  Cisco and Pancho abduct Ellen Roth (Kenyon) when they hold up a stage coach.  Once she tells her sad story about being a nurse being framed for murder of her charge, by the deceased's nephew Will Hastings (Willis), they agree to help clear her name.  As part of trapping Hastings, they demand a $10,000 ransom to release Roth. The ransom is immediately paid, and Roth is turned over to the sheriff. Running a fake newspaper story claiming the release of Roth by the sheriff, Cisco offers to kill Roth for Hastings. Roth is eventually cleared of the murder.

The film was preceded by the April 3 release of The Cisco Kid Returns,  which revealed Cisco's name to be Juan Francisco Hernandez, and was followed by South of the Rio Grande on September 15, with Cisco's name again being Juan Francisco Hernandez. Martin Garralaga appears in both as Pancho.

Cast
Duncan Renaldo – The Cisco Kid/Juan Carlos Francisco Antonio
Martin Garralaga – Pancho
Gwen Kenyon – Ellen Roth
Norman Willis – Will Hastings

References

External links
 
 
 
 

1945 films
1945 Western (genre) films
American black-and-white films
Cisco Kid
Films set in New Mexico
Monogram Pictures films
Films directed by Phil Rosen
Films scored by Albert Glasser
American Western (genre) films
1945 drama films
1940s English-language films
1940s American films